United Fisheries of Kuwait operates in Doha and Shuaiba in Kuwait. Their businesses include shrimp fishing, processing, import and export of fresh and frozen fish products.

Companies of Kuwait